Alma Lynn Cook is an American singer-songwriter and spoken word artist professionally known as Alma Cook. Her debut album Pass It On was released in 2012, and her single "For a Poet" and full-length project Tactics followed in 2014.

Biography
Cook grew up in Madison, Wisconsin, and attended Columbia College in Chicago. After college, she began playing at various clubs and festivals across the United States, opening for acts including contemporary gospel musician Jonathan McReynolds and Christian rapper George Moss.

Cook released an EP titled Pass It On in September 2012, followed by the single "For a Poet," which charted at No. 2 on Rádio Nova Portugal in December 2014. She later released the full-length album Tactics, produced by bassist Chris Thigpen, whose father Cornell Thigpen (Mary J. Blige, Chaka Kahn, Stevie Nicks, and Patti LaBelle) played organ on the song "Hotshot."

An album review by The Phantom Tollbooth magazine said of Cook's performance on Tactics, "Alma has the vocal innocence of Amber Rubarth combined with vocal qualities rivaling Denise Donatelli."

As of 2021, Cook was a podcast host and co-director of cultural engagement for Braver Angels, an American nonprofit focused on political depolarization. She was noted by Forbes as a conservative.

In addition to her work as a musician, Cook owns an oil and gas compliance company, Cook Compliance Solutions, based in Williston, North Dakota. The business works with oilfield service providers looking to obtain the right safety certifications, insurance and other measures needed to contract under larger oil companies.

Discography
 Pass It On (2012)
 Us Three: A Live Acoustic Session (2013)
 Tactics (2014)
 For a Poet – Single (2014)
 You & I – Single (2015)
 The Travel Size EP (2016)
 Hearsay – Single (2018)
 Surefire – Single (2018)
 Courtship (2019)
 So Close – Single (2019)

Appears on
 "Fast Car" (Daytrotter, 2013) – Kwesi K
 "What the DJ Spins" (Empire, 2014) – Terrence Howard
 "Get Your Life" (2015) – Caught A Ghost
 "Providence" (2016), "Painkillers" (2016) – OBY
 "White Lie" (2016), "Fountain" (2018), "Heavyweight" (2018) – Hamster
 "Gone" (2017) – Da$Htone
 "Someday" (2020) – Da$Htone

Recognition
 2014: Media Communication Association-International (MCA-I) WAVE Award and Judge's Choice Award for "Chicago (Beacons)" lyric video
 2015: MCA-I WAVE Award for "Hypocrite" lyric video

References

External links
 Official website
 IMDb profile

1991 births
Living people
Columbia College Chicago alumni
Musicians from Madison, Wisconsin
American women singer-songwriters
American women pianists
American sopranos
American ukulele players
21st-century American singers
21st-century American women singers
21st-century American pianists
Singer-songwriters from Wisconsin